"My Love Goes On and On" is a debut song co-written and recorded by American country music artist Chris Cagle. It was released in July 2000 as the first single from his debut album Play It Loud.  It peaked at #15 on the Hot Country Songs chart.  The song was written by Cagle and Don Pfrimmer.

Content
The song is an unabashed declaration of never-ending love and devotion.

Critical reception
Chuck Taylor, of Billboard magazine reviewed the song favorably, saying that "from Cagle's fiery performance - which is more grit and substance than vocal polish - to Robert Wright's go-for-broke production, this rollicking single is an all-out assault on the senses." He goes on to say that the lyric is "accented by a raging fiddle and pounding percussion."

Music video
The music video was directed by Eric Welch.

Chart performance
"My Love Goes On and On" debuted at number 65 on the U.S. Billboard Hot Country Singles & Tracks chart for the week of July 29, 2000.

Notes

References

2000 debut singles
2000 songs
Chris Cagle songs
Virgin Records singles
Songs written by Chris Cagle
Songs written by Don Pfrimmer